Bridget Tyrwhitt may refer to:
Lady Bridget Wingfield, married name Bridget Tyrwhitt during her third marriage
Lady Bridget Manners, married name Bridget Tyrwhitt